The Ministry of Interior (Misrad HaPnim) in the State of Israel is one of the government offices that is responsible for local government, citizenship and residency, identity cards, and student and entry visas. The current acting Minister is Michael Malchieli.

Responsibilities
 Providing citizenship and permanent resident status.
 Issuing of entry visas and staying visas in the country.
 Inhabitants administration: personal registration
 Issuing of Israeli identity cards.
 Issuing of Israeli passports.
 Personal registrations such as birth, marriage etc.
 Local government, city councils and local councils supervision
 Appointing and dismissing District Commissioners
 Elections
 Associations
 Planning and building supervising

Departments
 Local Government Administration
 Planning Administration
 Emergency Service Administration
 Biometric Database Administration Authority
 Population and Immigration Authority
 National Planning Headquarters
Source:

List of ministers

Deputy ministers

References

External links

Interior Ministry site
All Ministers in the Ministry of Internal Affairs Knesset website

Interior
Ministry of Interior
Interior
 
Israel